Hammam Righa (حمام ريغة) (ⵃⴻⵎⵎⴰⵎ ⵔⵉⵖⴰ) is a town in northern Algeria. During the period of Roman occupation, Hammam Righa was a Roman colony called Aquae Calidae.
It is located at 36.379474n, 2.395618e near the railway town of Boumedfaa, and is on the Oued Djer River.
The population in 2008 was 8488. and the population density is 369 persons/km².

Maurice Audin (1932-1957), mathematician, lived here from 1943 to 1946.

References 

Communes of Aïn Defla Province
Aïn Defla Province